(French for "free shooters") were irregular military formations deployed by France during the early stages of the Franco-Prussian War (1870–71). The term was revived and used by partisans to name two major French Resistance movements set up to fight against the Germans during World War II.

The term is sometimes used to refer more generally to guerrilla fighters who operate outside the laws of war.

Background
The Spanish word , the Portuguese word  and the Italian word , meaning sharpshooter or sniper, are derived from the word .

Franco-Prussian War

Francs-tireurs were an outgrowth of rifle-shooting clubs or unofficial military societies formed in the east of France at the time of the Luxembourg crisis of 1867. The members were chiefly concerned with the practise of rifle-shooting. In case of war, they were expected to act as militia or light troops. They wore no uniforms, but they armed themselves with the best existing rifles, and elected their own officers.

The 1911 Encyclopædia Britannica described them as "at once a valuable asset to the armed strength of France and a possible menace to internal order under military discipline." The societies strenuously and effectively resisted all efforts to bring them under normal military discipline.

In July 1870, at the outbreak of the Franco-Prussian War, the French minister of war assumed control over the societies to organize them for field service. They were sometimes organized in large bodies and incorporated in the mass of the armies, but more usually they continued to work in small bands, blowing up culverts on the invaders' lines of communication, cutting off small reconnaissance parties, surprising small posts, etc.

 blew up the Moselle railway bridge at Fontenoy-sur-Moselle, on 22 January 1871.

The Germans executed captured  as irregular, armed non-combatants, essentially what also came to be called guerrillas or insurgents. The Germans reacted to  ambushes with harsh reprisals against the nearest village or town, where they killed civilians. Whole regiments or divisions often took part in "pacifying actions" in areas with significant  activity; this created a lasting enmity and hatred between the occupying German soldiers and French civilians.

World War I
The experiences of French guerrilla attacks and of the asymmetric warfare during the Franco-Prussian War had a profound effect on the German General Staff. During World War I, they carried out an unusually harsh and severe occupation of areas which they conquered. Hostages were regularly executed in response to reports of sniping in French and Belgian communities. The occupying German forces were reportedly very fearful of spontaneous civil resistance, which led to these arrests and executions, some of which were preemptive or at least before actual violent resistance. Most of the attacks attributed by the German occupiers to Belgian francs-tireurs were actually carried out by regular Belgian Army snipers.

After the war, General Erich Ludendorff, Germany's chief military strategist and its commander-in-chief on the Western Front at the end of the war, tried to defend German behavior in his memoir published in 1919, the two-volume Meine Kriegserinnerungen, 1914–1918. It was published that same year in London by Hutchinson as My War Memories, 1914–1918 and in New York by Harper as Ludendorff's Own Story, August 1914 – November 1918.

In an article in the 13 September 1919 issue of Illustrated London News, the writer G. K. Chesterton responded to Ludendorff's book by remarking:

It is astounding how clumsy Prussians are at this sort of thing. Ludendorff cannot be a fool, at any rate, at his own trade; for his military measures were often very effective. But without being a fool when he effects his measures, he becomes a most lurid and lamentable fool when he justifies them. For in fact he could not have chosen a more unfortunate example. A franc-tireur is emphatically not a person whose warfare is bound to disgust any soldier. He is emphatically not a type about which a general soldierly spirit feels any bitterness. He is not a perfidious or barbarous or fantastically fiendish foe. On the contrary, a "franc-tireur" is generally a man for whom any generous soldier would be sorry, as he would for an honourable prisoner of war. What is a "franc-tireur"? A "franc-tireur" is a free man, who fights to defend his own farm or family against foreign aggressors, but who does not happen to possess certain badges and articles of clothing catalogued by Prussia in 1870. In other words, a "franc-tireur" is you or I or any other healthy man who found himself, when attacked, in accidental possession of a gun or pistol, and not in accidental possession of a particular cap or a particular pair of trousers. The distinction is not a moral distinction at all, but a crude and recent official distinction made by the militarism of Potsdam.

World War II

Two major Résistance groups adopted the name  during the German occupation of France during the Second World War. The first to be established was the Franc-Tireur group founded in Lyon in 1940. They only became active in the resistance after the German invasion of the Soviet Union in 1941.

Although individual communists had opposed the German occupation of France, the official Communist position was not to offer resistance, as the Soviet Union was in a non-aggression pact with Germany. After the German invasion of the Soviet Union on 22 June 1941, this position changed.

A number of smaller resistance groups united in the  under Pierre Villon, the former editor of the magazine . Their job was four-fold: to destroy rail lines carrying men and materials to the eastern front, sabotage factories working for the Germans, punish traitors and collaborators, and kill the occupying soldiers. "A librarian called Michel Bernstein became a master forger of false documents." And "France Bloch, a young chemist with two science degrees, who as a Jew had lost her job in the French National Museum of Natural History, was given the job of making explosives." Bloch was arrested by the French police and was beheaded by guillotine in Hamburg.

FTP became the first resistance group in France to deliberately kill a German.

The foreign workers' section of the FTP, the FTP-MOI, became especially famous after the Manouchian Group was captured, its members executed, and ten of its members advertised as foreign criminals by the infamous Affiche Rouge. The Manouchian Group operated in the Paris metropolitan area, but other FTP-MOI groups operated in Lyon and the South of France, where they carried out armed resistance. Many of its immigrant members throughout the country were Jewish artists, writers and intellectuals, who had gone to France for the cultural circles in Paris. Others had taken refuge in France to escape Nazi persecution in their home countries. Alter Mojze Goldman, father of Pierre Goldman and Jean-Jacques Goldman were members of FTP-MOI, as was the Hungarian photographer, Ervin Marton, who achieved international recognition after the war.

The PETA (Indonesian: Pembela Tanah Air – Defenders of the Homeland) and Heiho soldiers in the Japanese-occupied Dutch East Indies were considered Francs-tireurs by the Allies.

Prisoner status
Before the two world wars, the term  was sometimes used for an armed fighter who, if captured, was not necessarily entitled to prisoner of war status. An issue of disagreement at the 1899 Hague Conference, the controversy generated the Martens Clause. The Martens Clause was introduced as a compromise between the Great Powers, who considered francs-tireurs to be unlawful combatants subject to execution on capture, and smaller states, who maintained that they should be considered lawful combatants.

After World War II, during the Hostages Trial, the seventh of the Nuremberg Trials, the tribunal found that, on the question of partisans, according to the then-current laws of war, the partisan fighters in southeast Europe could not be considered lawful belligerents under Article 1 of the Hague Convention. In relation to Wilhelm List, the tribunal stated:

We are obliged to hold that such guerrillas were francs tireurs who, upon capture, could be subjected to the death penalty. Consequently, no criminal responsibility attaches to the defendant List because of the execution of captured partisans...

The post-war Geneva Convention established new protocols; according to Article 4 of the Third Geneva Convention of 1949,  are entitled to prisoner-of-war status provided that they are commanded by a person responsible for his subordinates, have a fixed distinctive sign recognizable at a distance, carry arms openly, and conduct their operations in accordance with the laws and customs of war.

Other uses
 was the name of an underground French Resistance newspaper published by the group in Lyon by the same name.

See also
French Resistance
Maquis (World War II)

Notes

References
 Lt. Colonel St. Etienne, Les Chasseurs des Vosges, Toul, 1906.
 Audoin-Rouzeau, Stéphane. 1870: La France dans la guerre. Paris: Armand Colin, 1989.
 Horne, John and Alan Kramer. German Atrocities, 1914: A History of Denial, New Haven: Yale University Press, 2001.
 Howard, Michael. The Franco Prussian War: The German Invasion of France, 1870–1871, 1961. Reprint, London and New York: Routledge, 1988.
 Mehrkens, Heidi Statuswechsel. Kriegserfahrung und nationale Wahrnehmung im Deutsch-Französischen Krieg 1870/71 (Essen: Klartext Verlag, 2008).
 Stoneman, Mark R. "The Bavarian Army and French Civilians in the War of 1870–71" (MA thesis, University of Augsburg, Germany, 1994).
 Stoneman, Mark R. "The Bavarian Army and French Civilians in the War of 1870–1871: A Cultural Interpretation", War in History 8.3 (2001): 271–93. Reprinted in Peter H. Wilson, ed., Warfare in Europe 1825–1914, The International Library of Essays on Military History, ed. Jeremy Black. London: Ashgate Publishing, 2006. 135–58. abstract
 Stoneman, Mark R. "Die deutschen Greueltaten im Krieg 1870/71 am Beispiel der Bayern", in Kriegsgreuel: Die Entgrenzung der Gewalt in kriegerischen Konflikten vom Mittelalter bis ins 20. Jahrhundert, ed. Sönke Neitzel and Daniel Hohrath (Paderborn: Ferdinand Schöningh, 2008), 223–39.

Military history of France
Paramilitary organizations based in France
Law of war
Combat occupations
Militias
Obsolete occupations